NUDY SHOW! is Anna Tsuchiya's third studio album and was released on 29 October 2008. A CD+DVD version of the album that was released includes Tsuchiya's music videos.

Track listing

2008 albums
Anna Tsuchiya albums
Avex Group albums